Aubrey Strode "Red" Newman (1903–1994) was a United States Army major general with 34 years of service. During World War II, Newman commanded the 34th Infantry Regiment of the 24th Infantry Division during the Philippines Campaign. His cry of "Follow Me!" at Leyte rallied his troops and inspired American infantrymen for decades. He was awarded the Distinguished Service Cross (DSC), the nation's second-highest award for valor in combat, for extraordinary heroism during this battle.

Biography

Aubrey Newman was born in Clemson, South Carolina on January 30, 1903. He graduated from the United States Military Academy at West Point in 1925.

While a lieutenant, Newman competed in the 1928 Olympics and finished 16th in the pentathlon.

Newman was a contributor to Army Magazine for many years. His articles on common sense leadership were very popular and were later published in three books: Follow Me: The Human Element in Leadership, Follow Me II: More on the Human Element in Leadership, and Follow Me III: Lessons on the Art and Science of High Command. He also authored What Generals are Made Of.

He died in Sarasota, Florida on January 19, 1994, and was buried at West Point Cemetery.

Legacy
Newman's books remain on the professional reading lists of the U.S. Army Command and General Staff College, the United States Marine Corps' Commandant, and many other military and paramilitary organizations.

The United States Army Forces Command (FORSCOM) recognizes outstanding junior leaders who demonstrate a commitment to developing their soldiers with the Major General Aubrey "Red" Newman Award.

See also

References

External links
Center of Military History Print of Newman rallying his troops on Leyte
US Army Command and General Staff College Hall of Fame Biography
FORSCOM Regulation for Major General Aubrey "Red" Newman Award

Recipients of the Distinguished Service Cross (United States)
1903 births
1994 deaths
United States Army Command and General Staff College alumni
United States Army generals
United States Army personnel of World War II
American male modern pentathletes
United States Military Academy alumni
Recipients of the Distinguished Service Medal (US Army)
Recipients of the Silver Star
Recipients of the Legion of Merit
Olympic modern pentathletes of the United States
Modern pentathletes at the 1928 Summer Olympics
20th-century American writers
20th-century American male writers
Burials at West Point Cemetery